Central American and Caribbean records in athletics are the best marks set in an event by an athlete who competes for a member nation of the Central American and Caribbean Athletic Confederation (CACAC). The organisation is responsible for ratification and it analyses each record before approving it. Records may be set in any continent and at any competition, providing that the correct measures are in place (such as wind-gauges) to allow for a verifiable and legal mark.

Outdoor
Key to tables:

+ = en route to a longer distance

A = affected by altitude

ht = hand timing

# = not ratified by federation

OT = oversized track (> 200m in circumference)

a = aided road course according to IAAF rule 260.28

Men

Women

Mixed

Indoor

Men

Women

References

External links
Central American and Caribbean Athletics Confederation website
AthleCAC – archived website for 2003–2008

Central American and Caribbean
Athletics in the Caribbean